Statistics of Qatar Stars League for the 1986–87 season.

Overview
Al-Sadd Sports Club won the championship.

References
Qatar - List of final tables (RSSSF)

1986–87 in Asian association football leagues
1986–87 in Qatari football